The Indian Detective is a Canadian crime comedy-drama series which debuted on CTV and Netflix in 2017. The show stars Russell Peters as Doug D'Mello, a police officer from Toronto who becomes embroiled in a murder investigation while visiting his father (Anupam Kher) in Mumbai during a one-month suspension for incompetence. The fourth episode ended in a cliffhanger, hinting at a possible second season; while Peters has stated at various times that a second season was in the works, none has been officially announced as of September 2019.

As of January 2020, Peters entered a partnership with Amazon Prime with the comedic special "Russell Peters: Deported," possibly delaying season 2 of The Indian Detective even further.

Production

The Canadian scenes of The Indian Detective were filmed on location in Toronto, and in surrounding areas in Ontario. The Canadian border crossing scenes were filmed at Canadian Tire Motorsport Park, and some of the Indian scenes were actually filmed in Cape Town, South Africa.

At the 7th Canadian Screen Awards in 2019, the series won the Golden Screen Award as the highest-rated Canadian television program of 2018.

Cast and characters
 Russell Peters as Douglas "Doug" D'Mello
 Anupam Kher as Stanley D'Mello
 William Shatner as David Marlowe
 Christina Cole as Robyn "Bob" Gerner
 Mishqah Parthiephal as Priya Sehgal
 Hamza Haq as Gopal Chandekar/ Amal Chandekar
 Deepti Jal Singh as Seema
 Meren Reddy as Inspector Abhishek Devo
 Nathan Dales as Agent Shamansky
 Veena Sood as Malika
 Angelo Tsarouchas as Informant in car

Episodes

References

External links

2017 Canadian television series debuts
2017 Canadian television series endings
CTV Television Network original programming
2010s Canadian crime drama television series
2010s Canadian comedy-drama television series
Television shows set in Toronto
Television shows set in Mumbai
Television shows filmed in South Africa